The Miombo rock thrush (Monticola angolensis) is a species of bird in the family Muscicapidae.
It is found in Angola, Botswana, Burundi, Democratic Republic of the Congo, Malawi, Mozambique, Rwanda, Tanzania, Zambia, and Zimbabwe.
Its natural habitat is dry savanna.

References

External links
 Miombo rock thrush - Species text in The Atlas of Southern African Birds.

Miombo rock thrush
Birds of Southern Africa
Miombo rock thrush
Taxonomy articles created by Polbot